The following is a list of ecoregions in Benin, according to the Worldwide Fund for Nature (WWF).

Terrestrial ecoregions

Tropical and subtropical moist broadleaf forests

Eastern Guinean forests
Nigerian lowland forests

Tropical and subtropical grasslands, savannas, and shrublands

Guinean forest-savanna mosaic
West Sudanian savanna

Freshwater ecoregions

Nilo-Sudan

Bight Coastal
Lower Niger-Benue

Marine ecoregions

Gulf of Guinea

Ecoregions of Africa
Ecoregions

Benin